Danny Richardson Young (born July 26, 1962) is an American former professional basketball player.  A 6' 3" guard who attended Wake Forest University, he played ten seasons (1984–1993; 1994–1995) in the NBA, spending time with the Seattle SuperSonics, Portland Trail Blazers, Los Angeles Clippers, Detroit Pistons, and Milwaukee Bucks.  Young was a key reserve on the 1990 Blazers team that reached the NBA Finals, and he retired with 2,622 NBA career points and 1,674 assists.

Seattle Supersonics
At the end of his time in Seattle, Young was low in the rotation, behind several other backup guards.  Seattle attempted to trade him but was unsuccessful.  Consequently, they waived him on November 3, 1988.

Portland Trail Blazers
Portland signed Young the same day he was waived.  He immediately became the third guard for the Blazers, behind Clyde Drexler and Terry Porter.  He was waived from the team January 1992 in order to make room for Lamont Strothers.

Career statistics

NBA

Regular season

|-
| align="left" | 1984–85
| align="left" | Seattle
| 3 || 0 || 8.7 || .200 || .000 || .000 || 1.0 || 0.7 || 1.0 || 0.0 || 1.3
|-
| align="left" | 1985–86
| align="left" | Seattle
| 82 || 29 || 23.2 || .506 || .324 || .849 || 1.5 || 3.7 || 1.3 || 0.1 || 6.9
|-
| align="left" | 1986–87
| align="left" | Seattle
| 73 || 26 || 20.3 || .458 || .367 || .831 || 1.5 || 4.8 || 1.0 || 0.0 || 4.8
|-
| align="left" | 1987–88
| align="left" | Seattle
| 77 || 0 || 12.3 || .408 || .286 || .811 || 1.0 || 2.8 || 0.7 || 0.0 || 3.2
|-
| align="left" | 1988–89
| align="left" | Portland
| 48 || 2 || 19.8 || .460 || .340 || .781 || 1.5 || 2.6 || 1.1 || 0.1 || 6.2
|-
| align="left" | 1989–90
| align="left" | Portland
| style="background:#cfecec;" | 82* || 8 || 17.0 || .421 || .271 || .813 || 1.5 || 2.8 || 1.0 || 0.0 || 4.7
|-
| align="left" | 1990–91
| align="left" | Portland
| 75 || 1 || 12.0 || .380 || .346 || .911 || 1.0 || 1.9 || 0.7 || 0.1 || 3.8
|-
| align="left" | 1991–92
| align="left" | Portland
| 18 || 0 || 7.4 || .400 || .300 || .714 || 0.5 || 1.1 || 0.3 || 0.0 || 2.5
|-
| align="left" | 1991–92
| align="left" | Los Angeles
| 44 || 5 || 20.2 || .391 || .333 || .887 || 1.5 || 3.5 || 0.9 || 0.1 || 5.3
|-
| align="left" | 1992–93
| align="left" | Detroit
| 65 || 2 || 12.9 || .413 || .324 || .875 || 0.7 || 1.8 || 0.5 || 0.1 || 2.9
|-
| align="left" | 1994–95
| align="left" | Milwaukee
| 7 || 0 || 11.0 || .529 || .417 || 1.000 || 0.7 || 1.7 || 0.6 || 0.0 || 3.4
|- class="sortbottom"
| style="text-align:center;" colspan="2"| Career
| 574 || 73 || 16.6 || .437 || .327 || .835 || 1.2 || 2.9 || 0.9 || 0.1 || 4.6
|}

Playoffs

|-
| align="left" | 1986–87
| align="left" | Seattle
| 14 || 0 || 14.9 || .404 || .313 || 1.000 || 1.1 || 3.4 || 1.1 || 0.0 || 4.1
|-
| align="left" | 1987–88
| align="left" | Seattle
| 5 || 0 || 19.0 || .524 || .000 || 1.000 || 2.0 || 3.8 || 0.4 || 0.4 || 6.4
|-
| align="left" | 1988–89
| align="left" | Portland
| 3 || 1 || 22.0 || .462 || .375 || .500 || 2.7 || 4.0 || 0.3 || 0.0 || 9.3
|-
| align="left" | 1989–90
| align="left" | Portland
| style="background:#cfecec;" | 21* || 0 || 14.0 || .389 || .379 || .704 || 1.4 || 1.5 || 0.7 || 0.1 || 4.1
|-
| align="left" | 1990–91
| align="left" | Portland
| 7 || 0 || 5.1 || .545 || .000 || .000 || 0.0 || 1.0 || 0.0 || 0.0 || 1.7
|-
| align="left" | 1991–92
| align="left" | Los Angeles
| 3 || 0 || 3.7 || .500 || .000 || .000 || 0.0 || 0.3 || 0.0 || 0.0 || 1.3
|- class="sortbottom"
| style="text-align:center;" colspan="2"| Career
| 53 || 1 || 13.4 || .430 || .322 || .816 || 1.2 || 2.2 || 0.6 || 0.1 || 4.1
|}

College

|-
| align="left" | 1980–81
| align="left" | Wake Forest
| 29 || 0 || 16.9 || .496 || - || .688 || 1.3 || 1.7 || 1.0 || 0.1 || 5.1
|-
| align="left" | 1981–82
| align="left" | Wake Forest
| 30 || 30 || 31.5 || .508 || - || .714 || 2.5 || 4.4 || 1.6 || 0.2 || 10.6
|-
| align="left" | 1982–83
| align="left" | Wake Forest
| 31 || 31 || 32.2 || .457 || .370 || .713 || 2.1 || 5.0 || 1.6 || 0.2 || 12.8
|-
| align="left" | 1983–84
| align="left" | Wake Forest
| 32 || 32 || 32.6 || .456 || - || .707 || 1.8 || 4.9 || 2.2 || 0.3 || 9.6
|- class="sortbottom"
| style="text-align:center;" colspan="2"| Career
| 122 || 93 || 28.5 || .475 || .370 || .708 || 1.9 || 4.0 || 1.6 || 0.2 || 9.6
|}

Playing style
Not known for flamboyant play, Young was valued for his ball-handling skills and steady, mistake-free play.

References

External links
Career Stats
College Stats

1962 births
Living people
African-American basketball players
American expatriate basketball people in France
American men's basketball players
Basketball players from Raleigh, North Carolina
Detroit Pistons players
Limoges CSP players
Los Angeles Clippers players
Milwaukee Bucks players
Point guards
Portland Trail Blazers players
Seattle SuperSonics draft picks
Seattle SuperSonics players
Wake Forest Demon Deacons men's basketball players
William G. Enloe High School alumni
Wyoming Wildcatters players